The Magic Walking Stick is a 1932 novel by the Scottish author John Buchan, his only novel for children. The first edition was illustrated by John Morton Sale.

Plot 
The novel relates the adventures of Bill, a 13-year-old boy, and his magic walking stick that has the power to take him and whoever he is holding by the hand to any desired place, from "the blinding white sands of the Solomon Islands ... [to] the rowans and birches of a wintry Highland Glen”. He visits the elephant's graveyard, plays a prank on some selfish neighbours, and helps a beleaguered young prince in a Balkan kingdom.

After hearing an old legend, Bill comes to believe the stick is one of the two staves mentioned in the Book of Zechariah 11:7, but whether it is "Beauty", which favours the pursuit of pleasure, or "Bands", which should be used only for serious purposes, he cannot decide.

Publication
The novel was first published in 1932 by Hodder & Stoughton, in an edition illustrated by John Morton Sale.

Background 

The Magic Walking Stick is Buchan's only novel for children. An early short version of the story was contained in a contribution that Buchan had made to Lady Cynthia Asquith's short story collection Sails of Gold (1927). Its genesis was a game that Buchan used to play with his own children.

References

External links
 
The Magic Walking Stick at Project Gutenberg Canada

Novels by John Buchan
1932 British novels
1932 children's books
British children's novels
Children's fantasy novels
British fantasy novels
Hodder & Stoughton books